The women's 500 metres races of the 2013–14 ISU Speed Skating World Cup 1, arranged in the Olympic Oval, in Calgary, Alberta, Canada, were held on 8 and 9 November 2013.

The podium placings of both races were identical – Lee Sang-hwa of South Korea won, followed by Jenny Wolf of Germany and Wang Beixing of China. In race two, Lee set a new world record with a time of 36.74 seconds. Yuliya Liteykina of Russia won Division B of race one, which promoted her to Division A of race two. Anice Dac of the Netherlands won Division B of race two.

Race 1
Race one took place on Friday, 8 November, with Division A scheduled in the morning session, at 11:00, and Division B scheduled in the afternoon session, at 15:49.

Division A

Division B

Race 2
Race two took place on Saturday, 9 November, with Division A scheduled in the morning session, at 11:00, and Division B scheduled in the afternoon session, at 15:30. Lee Sang-hwa improved her own world record with a time of 36.74 seconds.

Division A

Division B

References

Women 0500
1